Prince William (Wilhelm) of Baden may refer to:

Prince William of Baden (1792–1859), son of Charles Frederick, Grand Duke of Baden
Prince William of Baden (1829–1897), son of Leopold, Grand Duke of Baden